Helix SF was a quarterly American speculative fiction online magazine edited by William Sanders and Lawrence Watt-Evans.  The poetry editor was Bud Webster.

History and profile
Sanders began the magazine in 2006 as "a place where writers could publish things that none of the regular markets wanted to touch" without any attempt "to be a commercial publication."  The venture was supported entirely by reader donations, though Sanders emphasized in his first editorial that the intention was to make Helix SF "a professional-quality online magazine."  The magazine was not open to general submissions.

Each issue of Helix SF featured 7 stories, 4 to 6 poems, several regular columns, and editorials by both the editors.  The magazine was nominated for the 2008 Hugo Award for Best Semiprozine, the short story "Captive Girl" by Jennifer Pelland, published in the Fall 2006 issue, was nominated for the 2007 Nebula Award, and the poem "Thirteen Ways of Looking at a Black Hole" by Lawrence Schimel, published in the Winter 2007 issue, took the 3rd place Rhysling Award in the short poem category for 2007.  The short story "The Button Bin" by  Mike Allen, published in the Fall 2007 issue, was nominated for the 2008 Nebula Award.  The poem "Search" by Geoffrey A. Landis, published in the Fall 2008 issue, won the long form Rhysling Award in 2009.

In the Fall, 2008 issue, Sanders announced "This will be the final issue of Helix." Sanders stated that "Perhaps the biggest one is the ongoing failure to develop a broad support base. Not that we've ever hurt for money — we've always been able to pay the writers, if not pro rates, at least considerably better than the average free webzine - but as things have turned out, the support has come mainly from a small number of amazingly generous donors, rather than over a wide range of the readership." On January 1, 2009, the Helix archives were removed from the web and replaced with an explanation for the magazine's demise and links to several of the stories at other locations.  Helix's entire domain is now unavailable as the domain registration was not renewed.

Other authors published include Jayme Lynn Blaschke, Bruce Boston, Adam-Troy Castro, Melanie Fletcher, Esther Friesner, Janis Ian, N.K. Jemisin, Jay Lake, Vera Nazarian, Michael H. Payne, Peg Robinson, Jane Yolen, and Steven H Silver.

References

External links
 The editor's explanation for the magazine's demise

Quarterly magazines published in the United States
Defunct science fiction magazines published in the United States
Magazines established in 2006
Magazines disestablished in 2008
Science fiction webzines